Domino Players is a painting by American painter Horace Pippin. The painting depicts a domestic scene, in which three individuals are playing dominoes while another looks on. The piece is held by the Phillips Collection. The New York Times praised the piece for "[bringing] a seldom-recorded existence vividly to life."

References

1943 paintings